Podensac is a commune in the Gironde department. It is located in the famous Bordeaux wine region in Nouvelle-Aquitaine (southwestern France).

Geography
Podensac is located within the Graves vineyards, on the left bank of the Garonne river, 30 km (19 mi) southeast from Bordeaux and 15 km (9 mi) northwest from Langon. Podensac station has rail connections to Langon and Bordeaux.

Population

Twin towns
 Morengo (Lombardy, Italy; since 2018)

Economy
Lillet company (apéritif made of wine and orange liquor). Lillet is famous for being the drink of James Bond in Casino Royale and Quantum of Solace films.
Maison Des Vins de Graves: a winehouse dedicated to the Graves wines.

Main sights
Château d´eau Le Corbusier, a Swiss-French architect (pioneers of what is now called modern architecture) (http://www.fondationlecorbusier.asso.fr/podensac.htm)
Château Chavat: a 1917 castle classified in 2006 as a Monument historique (National Heritage Site of France). It is surrounded by a garden labelled as Remarkable Gardens of France.
Eglise Saint-Vincent: a church classified in 1925 as a Monument historique.
Mascaret (tidal bore): the mascaret is a phenomenon in which the leading edge of the incoming tide forms a wave of water in the Gironde estuary that then travels up the Garonne river.

See also
Communes of the Gironde department
http://www.podensac.fr City website (in French)

References

Communes of Gironde